Koreans in Taiwan are the 30th-largest population of overseas Koreans and the 9th-largest foreign community in Taiwan.

History 
Though a few Korean fishermen lost at sea during the Joseon Dynasty settled in Taiwan, they never formed a significant population. Even after Japan took control of Taiwan in 1895 and then Korea a decade later, Korean migration to Taiwan was minimal; it was only in the aftermath of the March 1st Movement of 1919 and the associated economic difficulties it caused that Korean migration to Taiwan became a mass phenomenon. Most settled in Keelung and other port cities, where they made a living by fishing. During World War II, some Koreans were also conscripted into labour service and brought to Taiwan. After Japan's defeat in the war ended Japanese rule in Taiwan, an estimated 1,300 Korean soldiers serving with the Imperial Japanese Army and 2,000 civilians organised their own repatriation to the Korean peninsula, and by 1946, only 400-500 Koreans were recorded as living in Taiwan.

The incoming Kuomintang government established comparatively rigid requirements for residence in Taiwan, and so the only Koreans who were able to obtain residence cards were officials and those with skills that would be useful in the postwar reconstruction, such as engineers. Those who remained founded the Korea Association in Taiwan in 1947. Due to the government's policy of discrimination in favour of native fishermen, most Koreans were forced out of the fishing industry, and into agriculture and commerce; they slowly moved away from Keelung, towards other major urban areas such as Taipei and Kaohsiung.

Education
Taiwan's first school for South Korean nationals, the Kaohsiung Korea School, was founded on 25 January 1961, while the Taipei Korean Elementary School was founded a year later, on 1 February 1962. As of 2007, the schools enrolled 22 and 50 students, respectively.

Demography
In 2011, statistics of South Korea's Ministry of Foreign Affairs and Trade showed 3,968 South Korean nationals or former nationals living in Taiwan. This represented an increase of 26% over the 2009 figure of 3,158 (2009). 420 had Republic of China nationality, 283 were permanent residents, 686 were international students, and the remaining 2,579 had other kinds of visas. June 2012 statistics of National Immigration Agency (which do not count naturalised citizens formerly holding South Korean nationality) stated that there were 3,574; among them, 1,494 had work authorisation (332 businesspeople, 96 engineers, 47 lecturers, 169 missionaries, 58 unemployed, and 792 authorised for other kinds of work), while the remainder did not (647 homemakers, 774 students, 652 children under the age of 15, and 7 in other categories).

Notable people
Cho Myung-Ha (1905-1928), Korean independence activist
Lee Hyeong-Suk, former South Korean Olympic women's basketball team member, now a coach at Pu-Men High School
Yoo Ha-na, television actress (Originally from Seoul, South Korea)
Emily Song, singer and model; member of girl group Dream Girls (Originally from Seoul, South Korea)
Nicky Lee, singer (Korean American)

See also
Chinese people in Korea
Korean Mission in Taipei
South Korea–Taiwan relations

References

External links
Taipei Korean Elementary School 
Kaohsiung Korea School 
Taipei Korean School - Ministry of Education (Republic of China) 
Kaoshiung Korean School - Ministry of Education (Republic of China) 

Asian diaspora in Taiwan
Immigration to Taiwan
Taiwan
Taiwan, Koreans in
 
Taiwan under Japanese rule